Vetrenno-Teleutskoye is a rural locality (a selo) and the administrative center of Teleutsky Selsoviet, Kamensky District, Altai Krai, Russia. The population was 282 as of 2013. There are 5 streets.

Geography 
Vetrenno-Teleutskoye is located 52 km southwest of Kamen-na-Obi (the district's administrative centre) by road. Podvetrenno-Teleutskoye is the nearest rural locality.

References 

Rural localities in Kamensky District, Altai Krai